Thai Pacific Airlines was a short-lived airline based in Thailand that ceased all of its operations in July 2004.

Code data 
IATA Code: 3P
ICAO Code: TPV
Callsign: THAI PACIFIC

History
Thai Pacific was founded by Wasant Singhamany, who announced the start-up of the airline in August 2003, with plans for a Bangkok-Sydney service starting on October 1 of that year using a Boeing 747-200 aircraft.

But by July 2004, the airline had shut down, with money owed to its staff and to its landlord. And in March 2006, Thailand's Civil Aviation Department said it was withdrawing the license for the failed carrier.

Fleet
Thai Pacific had one aircraft, a Boeing 747-200, HS-VSV.

References

 Chiang Mai Mail (July 3–9, 2004) "Thai Pacific Air closes down" (Retrieved March 8, 2006).
 Sritama, Suchat (March 7, 2006). "Phuket Air angles for new name, license, The Nation.

External links
 Thai Pacific Airlines

Defunct airlines of Thailand
Airlines established in 2003
Airlines disestablished in 2004
2004 disestablishments in Thailand
Thai companies established in 2003